The Battle of Flanders is the name of several battles fought in Flanders during the First World War:

 First Battle of Flanders (19 October – 22 November 1914) - The First Battle of Ypres, a battle fought during the Race to the Sea
 Second Battle of Flanders (21 April – 25 May 1915) - The Second Battle of Ypres
 Third Battle of Flanders (11 July – 10 November 1917) - The Battle of Passchendaele/Third Battle of Ypres, an Anglo-French offensive
 Fourth Battle of Flanders (9–29 April 1918) - The Battle of the Lys/Operation Georgette, second part of the German spring offensive
 Fifth Battle of Flanders (28 September – 2 October 1918) - The Fifth Battle of Ypres, a Belgian-French-British offensive during the Hundred Days
 The Belgian football derby between  Club Brugge and Gent